Peter Carr (January 2, 1770 – February 17, 1815) was an American educator and politician who served several terms in the Virginia House of Delegates. He is primarily known for the Jefferson–Hemings controversy, as he was rumored to have fathered children by Sally Hemings.

Personal life
Carr was born in Goochland County, Virginia on January 2, 1770, to Dabney and Martha Jefferson Carr, sister to Thomas Jefferson. Carr was educated in Orange and Williamsburg, and later attended the College of William and Mary. He briefly practiced as a lawyer.

Carr married Esther "Hetty" Smith Stevenson on June 6, 1797, and the two had eight children together. Carr died in his home at Carrsbrook on February 17, 1815.

Career

Politics
Carr supported the Republican Party and in 1799, unsuccessfully ran for the Virginia House of Delegates. A later attempt in 1801 proved to be more successful and he was elected for four terms, from 1801 to 1804, and later from 1807 to 1808. An attempt to run for another term was met with failure, as was his attempt to run for Virginia State Senate.

Carr triggered the final breach between his uncle and George Washington by writing the latter a seemingly sympathetic letter on September 27, 1797  under the pseudonym "John Langhorne." Washington was suspicious of the letter's purpose, suspicions that were finalized when John Nicholas, the Federalist clerk of Albemarle County, Virginia, Jefferson's home county, informed Washington that "Langhorne" was leagued with Republican interests, was attempting to bait Washington into revealing High Federalist principles, and was actually Carr. Carr's exact purpose in writing the letter is unknown.

Education
Carr was a supporter of education and in 1811, he opened up a short-lived academy on his estate Carrsbrook. In the early 1800s he was involved with the founding of the Albemarle Academy, an institution that evolved into the Central College and proved influential with the founding of the University of Virginia.

Jefferson–Hemings controversy

In 1802 journalist James Thomson Callender claimed that Thomas Jefferson had fathered children with one of his slaves, Sally Hemings. These claims were given credence due to several factors such as Jefferson's presence at Monticello during the time periods that the children were conceived and the lack of pregnancies when he was not present. Theories that Carr and his brother Samuel could have fathered the children surfaced in the mid-1800s due to secondhand accounts where Thomas Jefferson Randolph claimed that Peter and Samuel Carr were responsible. These claims are still given credence by some scholars, even though DNA tests in 1998 ruled that the Carrs could not have fathered one of Hemings's children, Eston.

References

External links
 1787 letter from Thomas Jefferson to Peter Carr at TeachingAmericanHistory.org
 1814 letter from Thomas Jefferson to Peter Carr at Encyclopedia Virginia

1770 births
1815 deaths
Members of the Virginia House of Delegates
People from Goochland County, Virginia
People from Albemarle County, Virginia
Virginia colonial people
Burials at Monticello